Area code 517 is the area code which serves the south central portion of the Lower Peninsula of Michigan, centered on the state capital, Lansing.  Other notable cities within 517 include Charlotte, Mason, Eaton Rapids, East Lansing, Holt, Jackson, Albion, Howell, Coldwater, Adrian, Blissfield, and Hillsdale.

517 was one of the original area codes created in 1947. It initially covered the eastern half of the Lower Peninsula, outside the southeast (Metro Detroit and Flint), which was assigned area code 313. Besides Lansing, It included the Tri-Cities (Saginaw, Bay City and Midland) and much of Mid-Michigan, then it was later expanded to include Jackson. It was one of the largest area codes east of the Mississippi River that did not cover an entire state.  On April 7, 2001; the central and northern portions of the old 517 territory became area code 989.  Until then, despite the presence of Lansing and the Tri-Cities, 517 had been the only one of Michigan's original three area codes to have never been split, and one of the few remaining original area codes (not counting those serving an entire state) to have never been split or overlaid.

References

External links 

 List of 517 Area Code exchanges from AreaCodeDownload.com

517
517
Central Michigan
Telecommunications-related introductions in 1947